James Bisset (14 October 1836 – 8 October 1919) was an architect and civil engineer of the Cape Colony, responsible for many of the Cape's early buildings and communications infrastructure. He was also Mayor of Wynberg, South Africa.

Early life
James Bisset was born in 1836 in Aberdeen, Scotland, son of a City Councillor and Master of Mortifications William Bisset and his wife Margaret. He was one of 6 brothers and 3 sisters. He trained as an engineer at London University and did his early work on Crystal Palace, Sydenham station as well as a range of railway projects and public buildings around Europe.

Early work in the Cape

In 1858 he was sent to the Cape, aged 22, to begin work on its first railway, for the infant Cape Railway and Dock Company (later to become the Cape Government Railways). This railway stretched from Cape Town to Wellington, and his team began work on it on 31 March 1859. Another section was built from Cape Town to Wynberg. In 1861 he worked on construction of Cape Town's tramways, including the line to Sea point, (originally horse-drawn) with the "Green Point Tramway Company". He later also completed a similar project for Port Elizabeth. 

During this time, he also worked on a range of architectural and engineering projects throughout the Cape, including the old Mutual Assurance building in Cape Town, Dutch Reformed Churches and several other buildings in Beaufort West and Graaff-reinet, as well as the Town Hall and principal churches of Port Elizabeth.

Cape government railways

In 1872, the Cape attained a degree of independence from Britain and its first Prime Minister, John Molteno, driving a massive expansion in the Cape's economic infrastructure, consolidated the country's railway lines into the Cape Government Railways. The few existing rudimentary lines were to be turned into a nationwide network, connecting the country's ports to the diamond fields of Kimberley and the agricultural hinterland. James Bisset had played a significant part in deciding on the gauge to be used for the national railway system, and was involved in selecting Cape gauge for this purpose.  He inaugurated and directed the first early railway line of the "Cape Midland Line", running from Port Elizabeth to Uitenhage. He was also appointed to lead construction of the "Cape Eastern Line", running from East London.

Political career
Bisset typically pursued several simultaneous occupations throughout his career. He served in the Anglo-Boer War and chaired the School, Municipal and Hospital Boards. 

He was a councillor for Liesbeeck Municipality (1883-1886), Mayor of Wynberg (1886, 1893) and briefly Mayor of Claremont. 

While Mayor of Wynberg, he obtained the grant of land for what became Wynberg Park. 
He also succeeded in making Wynberg the first municipality in the greater Cape Peninsula area to get electric street lighting.

Family and later life
Early in his career, on 16 October 1862, he had married Elizabeth Magdalena Christina Jarvis, daughter of Cape Town Mayor Hercules Jarvis, and they had 6 sons and a daughter. One of his sons, Murray Bisset was a Test cricketer who captained South Africa before moving to Southern Rhodesia where he briefly served as Governor of Southern Rhodesia. Another was the international Rugby union player William Molteno "Bill" Bisset.

James Bisset died on 8 October 1919 at Beauleigh, his house in Kenilworth, Cape Town.

References

1836 births

1919 deaths
Alumni of the University of London
People from Aberdeen
South African engineers
Cape Colony politicians
Mayors of places in South Africa
19th-century South African people
19th-century South African politicians
19th-century South African engineers
19th-century South African architects
Politicians from Aberdeen
Scottish emigrants to South Africa